This is a list of countries by smartphone penetration. These numbers are based on the top countries by percentage of population owning a smartphone (so smaller countries are absent) and come from Newzoo's Global Mobile Market Report (the numbers were last updated in 
June 2021).

2022 rankings

2021 rankings

2020 rankings 
Newzoo's 2020 Global Mobile Market Report shows countries/markets sorted by smartphone penetration (percentage of population actively using a smartphone). These numbers come from Newzoo's Global Mobile Market Report 2020 - Light Version.

2019 rankings 
Newzoo's 2019 Global Mobile Market Report shows countries/markets sorted by smartphone penetration (percentage of population actively using a smartphone). These numbers come from Newzoo's Global Mobile Market Report 2019 - Light Version.

2018 rankings 
Newzoo's 2018 Global Mobile Market Report shows countries/markets sorted by smartphone penetration (percentage of population). These numbers come from Newzoo's Global Mobile Market Report 2018. By total number of smartphone users, "China by far has the most, boasting 783 million users. India took the #2 spot with 375 million users (less than half of China’s number). However, that gap will decrease by 2021, when we expect India to have 601 million smartphone users. The U.S. came in at #3, accounting for 252 million of the world’s smartphones."

2017 rankings 
Newzoo's 2017 Global Mobile Market Report shows countries/markets sorted by smartphone penetration (percentage of population). These numbers come from Newzoo's Global Mobile Market Report 2017

2016 rankings 
The following list of countries by smartphone penetration was measured by the Pew Research Center survey conducted in 40 nations among 45,435 respondents from March 25 to May 27, 2015.

A different research performed by eMarketer indicates that the smartphone penetration in Denmark is 81%.

2015 rankings 
The following list of countries by smartphone penetration was measured by the Pew Research Center survey conducted in 40 nations among 45,435 respondents from March 25 to May 27, 2015.

A different research performed by eMarketer indicates that the smartphone penetration in Denmark is 81%.

2013 rankings 
The following list of the countries by smartphone penetration was measured by Google's Our Mobile Planet in 2013.

See also 
 List of countries by number of broadband Internet subscriptions
 List of countries by number of Internet users
 List of countries by number of telephone lines in use
 List of mobile network operators
 List of multiple-system operators
 List of telephone operating companies

References 

Smartphone penetration
Smartphone penetration
Penetration,Country
Countries by smartphone penetration